Gerhard Lauck refers to:

Gary Lauck (born 1953), American Neo-Nazi
Gerd Lauck (born 1931), German footballer